The Glass Intact is the second album by the Champaign, Illinois band Sarge.  It was released in 1998 on Mud Records.

The album was somewhat of a breakout hit, getting a feature-length review at Salon.com and the Village Voice, and causing the band to become a 1998 "Hot Band" in Rolling Stone as well as being one of Spin Magazine'''s "98 for '98."

Reception

Jason Ankeny of AllMusic declared the album to be "a kind of apotheosis of '90s-era girl-punk", finding the album combined the "emotional intensity of Sleater-Kinney, the melodic aggression of Team Dresch, and the sheer exuberance of Cub, yet their best trick of all is that they sound like an absolute original." Ankeny noted that Elizabeth Elmore "a gifted composer, an acute lyricist, and a nakedly honest vocalist", concluding that the album "is at heart a rock & roll album in the classic sense: cathartic, impassioned, and vividly alive." Stephanie Zacharek of Spin also noted the albums debt to riot grrl music with its "explosive emotional intensity", finding the album "nervy, hopelessly seductive and hell-bent for trouble and heartache, The Glass Intact'' peers at the world through a very dark lens - but the sun, with its menace and warmth is never far from view.

Track listing
 Stall
 A Torch
 Beguiling
 Charms and Feigns
 Homewrecker
 Half as Far
 I Took You Driving
 Fast Girls
 The First Morning
 Put in the Reel
 To Keep You Trained

Credits
Credits adapted from the album's liner notes.

 Elizabeth Elmore - guitars, vocals, piano
 Rachel Switzky - bass
 Chad Romanski - drums
 Pat Cramer - additional guitars on track s1, 3, 4, and 5
 Matt Allison - engineer, producer
 Sarge - producer
 Brendan Gamble - recording engineer on tracks 3, 5, and 9.

References

1998 albums
Sarge (band) albums